Nikola "Nikša" Prkačin (born 15 November 1975) is a Croatian retired professional basketball player and coach. At a height of 2.08 m (6'10") tall, he played at the power forward and center positions. During his professional club playing career, Prkačin won seven European national domestic league championships, nine European national domestic cup titles, and one European national domestic super cup title, in 16 seasons.

Early years and career
Prkačin started his basketball club career in his hometown of Dubrovnik, where he played with the local team of Pomorac.

Professional career

Split Croatia
In 1993, at the age of 18, Prkačin moved to the Croatian Premier League club Split Croatia, where he played for the next five seasons. Prkačin established himself as the successor to Split's famous center Dino Rađja, and during his time with the club, he also gained significant experience and knowledge. After a few seasons, he became one of the team's key players. With Split, he won two Croatian Cup titles.

Cibona Zagreb
Prior to the 1998–99 season, Prkačin moved to the then Croatian Premier League champions Cibona Zagreb, where he resided for the next five seasons. With Cibona, he won five Croatian Premier League championships and four Croatian Cup titles. He also won the EuroLeague's Opening Tournament in 2001. He was named the Croatian Premier League's Most Valuable Player in 2002. While with Cibona Zagreb, some his teammates included: Slaven Rimac, Zoran Planinić, Josip Sesar, Dino Rađja, and Chucky Atkins

Efes Istanbul
After spending a decade building up his career in the Croatian Premier League, Prkačin finally signed a contract with a foreign club. In 2003, he signed with the Turkish Super League club Efes Istanbul. Prkačin established himself in the club, as he played on a regular basis, as the club's forward-center. He played four seasons with Efes.

With Efes, he won two Turkish Super League championships, and two Turkish Cup titles.

Dynamo Moscow
In 2007, Prkačin joined the Russian Super League club Dynamo Moscow. He played the club during the 2007–08 season. He left the club before the season ended, in January 2008.

Panathinaikos Athens
In January 2008, during the second half of the 2007–08 season, Prkačin joined the Greek League club Panathinaikos Athens. With Panathinaikos, he won the Greek League championship and the Greek Cup title.

Return to Cibona Zagreb
Prior to the 2008–09 season, Prkačin moved back to Croatia, as he signed a €400,000 euros net income annual contract with Cibona Zagreb.

Zagreb
In 2009, Prkačin joined the Croatian club Zagreb. He finished his basketball club playing career with Zagreb in 2010.

National team career
Prkačin was a member of the Croatian Under-22 junior national team. His debut at a major tournament with the senior Croatian national team's selection came at the 1997 EuroBasket. After that, he played with Croatia at the following major FIBA tournaments: the 1999 EuroBasket, the 2001 EuroBasket, the 2003 EuroBasket, the 2005 EuroBasket, and the 2007 EuroBasket, He also represented Croatia at the 2008 Summer Olympics and the 2009 EuroBasket. Prkačin was Croatia's team captain twice.

Coaching career
After he retired from playing professional club basketball, Prkačin began working as a basketball coach. From 2012 to 2014, he was an assistant coach with the senior men's Croatian national team.

Player profile
Prkačin mainly played at the center position, although he also played as a power forward. Prkačin was known for his pick and roll play, precise hook shot, and mid-range jump shot. Although he was shorter in height compared to most other European centers of his era, Prkačin compensated for that with his immense strength and body balance. It was a rarity to see Prkačin attempt a three point field goal.

Career trajectory

Personal life
Prkačin resides in Zagreb, Croatia, with his wife and five children, one of whom is Roko Prkačin, who is also a professional basketball player. In his free time, he enjoys fishing and playing water polo.

References

External links

 FIBA Profile
 FIBA Europe Profile
 Euroleague.net Profile
 Adriatic League Profile
 Turkish Super League Profile
 RealGM.com Profile
 Eurobasket.com profile

1975 births
Living people
ABA League players
Anadolu Efes S.K. players
Basketball players at the 2008 Summer Olympics
BC Dynamo Moscow players
Centers (basketball)
Croatian basketball coaches
Croatian men's basketball players
KK Cibona players
KK Split players
KK Zagreb players
Olympic basketball players of Croatia
Panathinaikos B.C. players
Power forwards (basketball)